Dordrecht Stadspolders is a railway station in Dordrecht, Netherlands. The station is located on the MerwedeLingelijn between Dordrecht and Geldermalsen (part of the Elst–Dordrecht railway). It was opened on 27 May 1990 and initially had only one track.

Arriva has operated the service since December 2006, but Qbuzz took over services on 9 December 2018. The station is in the residential area Stadspolders. The station was expanded in 2011, with the building of a second track and platform, to allow 4 trains per hour in each direction. The connection between this station and the Dordrecht railway station has also two tracks.

Train services

Bicycles are allowed on board for free.

Bus services

External links

Arriva website 
Dutch Public Transport journey planner 

Stadspolders
Railway stations opened in 1990
Railway stations on the Merwede-Lingelijn
1990 establishments in the Netherlands
Railway stations in the Netherlands opened in the 20th century